Nyalka is a village in Győr-Moson-Sopron county, Hungary.

Nyalka was first mentioned in 1001 as Chimudi. King Ladislaus I donated it to the Benedictine Abbey of Pannonhalma. During the Ottoman invasion, the Esterházy and Cseszneky families also had noble estates in the village. The Turks destroyed the village, but after 1680 was repopulated by Hungarian serfs.

External links 
 Street map 

Populated places in Győr-Moson-Sopron County